Sometimes Just the Sky is a 2018 studio album by American country musician Mary Chapin Carpenter featuring re-recorded songs from earlier in her career, with one track from each of her previous studio albums and a new title track. It has received positive reviews from critics and was commercially successful, placing on several charts, and topping Official Americana Albums Chart in the United Kingdom.

Recording and release
The album was recorded live in studio at Real World Studios and was accompanied by a tour celebrating 30 years of Carpenter's recording career. Carpenter set about to make the new recordings by choosing songs that were not hits of hers and that she also had not recorded on her 2014 orchestral album Songs from the Movie, which saw 10 cuts from her career reintepreted.

Reception
The editorial staff of AllMusic Guide scored Sometimes Just the Sky 3.5 out of five stars, with reviewer Mark Deming comparing this to Songs from the Movie; he considers this re-recorded material to have "a strong enough personality of its own that it avoids this pitfall" of being weaker than the originals or unable to stand on its own as a musical statement. Jim Hynes of Glide Magazine rated this release a nine out of 10, writing that fans can enjoy "intense listening" to the instrumentation and sometimes radical reinterpretations of Carpenter's songs, summing up that "there’s more than enough to savor here" while waiting for an album of new material.

Track listing
All songs written by Mary Chapin Carpenter
"Heroes and Heroines" – 4:14
"What Does It Mean to Travel" – 3:36
"I Have a Need for Solitude" – 4:35
"One Small Heart" – 5:18
"The Moon and St. Christopher" – 4:25
"Superman" – 6:08
"Naked to the Eye" – 3:31
"Rhythm of the Blues" – 3:59
"This Is Love" – 5:20
"Jericho" – 4:43
"The Calling" – 4:02
"This Shirt" – 5:02
"Sometimes Just the Sky" – 6:23

Personnel
Mary Chapin Carpenter – acoustic guitar, vocals
Dave Bronze – bass guitar
Aaron Farrington – photography
Daniel Hosterman – live performance photography
Oli Jacobs – assistant engineering
Stephanie Jean – piano, Omnichord, organ, harmonium, Wurlitzer keyboards
Ethan Johns – acoustic guitar, electric guitar, slide guitar, mandolin, mandocello, tipple, mountain dulcimer, mixing at Three Crows East, production, in-studio photography
Georgina Leach – violin, viola
Duke Levine – electric guitar, acoustic guitar, e-bow; mandolin on "Naked to the Eye"
Dom Monks – recording
Mandy Parnell – mastering at Black Saloon Studios
Jeremy Stacey – drums, percussion
Lisa Wright – design

Chart performance

See also
List of 2018 albums

References

External links

Review from Folk Radio
Interview with Carpenter on the state of country music in 2018

2018 albums
Mary Chapin Carpenter albums
Albums produced by Ethan Johns